Johan Albert Eerola (28 April 1874, in Tuulos – 3 October 1950) was a Finnish farmer and politician. He was a member of the Parliament of Finland from 1924 to 1927 and again from 1939 to 1945, representing the National Coalition Party.

References

1874 births
1950 deaths
People from Hämeenlinna
People from Häme Province (Grand Duchy of Finland)
National Coalition Party politicians
Members of the Parliament of Finland (1924–27)
Members of the Parliament of Finland (1939–45)
Finnish people of World War II